Gonokhovo is a rural locality (a selo) and the administrative center of Gonokhovsky Selsoviet, Zavyalovsky District, Altai Krai, Russia. The population was 1,787 as of 2013. There are 20 streets.

Geography 
Gonokhovo is located 37 km northeast of Zavyalovo (the district's administrative centre) by road. Dobraya Volya is the nearest rural locality.

References 

Rural localities in Zavyalovsky District, Altai Krai